The red-headed cockchafer or red-headed pasture cockchafer (Adoryphorus couloni or Adoryphorus coulonii) is a species of Australian scarab beetle in the genus Adoryphorus. It is a pasture pest in Victoria, New South Wales, South Australia and Tasmania. It has become naturalised in Canterbury, New Zealand, where it was first recorded in 1963.

Description 
The adult beetle is 10–15mm long, 8mm wide, and shiny reddish-brown to black. The larva is white-grey in the early stage. Older larva have yellowish legs and a hard red-brown head, and then become white when mature.

References 

Scarabaeidae
Beetles of Australia
Beetles of New Zealand